Abiola Ahmed Akinbiyi (born 27 January 1996), professionally known as Bella Shmurda, is a Nigerian singer. 
He rose to prominence with the release of the song "Vision 2020", and a follow-up remix which featured Nigeria rapper Olamide.

Early life and career 
Shmurda rose to prominence after his debut single "Vision 2020", and a follow-up (remix) to the single in which he featured Olamide. He released several hit songs in 2020, some of which featured top musicians, one of which is "Cash App" featuring  Zlatan. He was nominated for the Headies Award for the next rated in 2020.

In 2020, Bella Shmurda won the awards "Next Rated Male" and "Street Music of the Year" at the City People Entertainment Awards, he was also nominated for "Revelation of the Year" award in the same year.

In 2021, Bella Shmurda was nominated for the "Next Rated" award at the Headies Awards. In June 2021, his single, "Cash App" featuring Zlatan and Lincoln was nominated for "Most Played Song - Street Pop" at the NET Honours.

Bella Shmurda was inducted into the 2021 YouTube Foundry Programme. He was the only African artist to be included in this class.

On 10 June 2021, Shmurda revealed on his Instagram page that he intends to release the second volume of his debut EP titled “High Tension Vol. 2", which is scheduled to be released in July 2021 and the album artwork was also shared on his page. He released the EP on 7 July 2021.

Shmurda made his debut at the 02 Arena in the United Kingdom, as a surprise guest performer, at singer Wizkid's Made in Lagos concert in November 2021. He also received the 2021 Youtube Foundry grant to invest in his content and channel development.

Philanthropy
In October 2021, a video of a pre-schooler performing rapper Olamide’s song “Triumphant” off his album “Carpe Diem” which featured Shmurda, caught the singer's attention, as it went viral on the internet. In response, Shmurda made a commitment to put the child on a scholarship throughout his primary school education. The scholarship came into effect in November 2021.

On his birthday in January 2022, Shmurda announced that he would feed a thousand destitute persons every year on his birthday.

Discography

EPs 
High Tension (2020)
High Tension 2.0 (2021)

Singles

Featured in

Awards and nominations

See also 
 List of Nigerian musicians

References 

Living people
21st-century Nigerian male singers
1996 births